The Eagleswood Township School District is a community public school district that serves students in pre-kindergarten through sixth grade from Eagleswood Township in Ocean County, New Jersey, United States.

As of the 2018–19 school year, the district, comprising one school, had an enrollment of 134 students and 16.6 classroom teachers (on an FTE basis), for a student–teacher ratio of 8.1:1. In the 2016–17 school year, Eagleswood had the 20th smallest enrollment of any school district in the state, with 141 students.

The district is classified by the New Jersey Department of Education as being in District Factor Group "B", the second-lowest of eight groupings. District Factor Groups organize districts statewide to allow comparison by common socioeconomic characteristics of the local districts. From highest socioeconomic status to lowest, the categories are A, B, CD, DE, FG, GH, I and J.

Public school students in seventh through twelfth grades attend the schools of the Pinelands Regional School District, which also serves students from Bass River Township, Little Egg Harbor Township and Tuckerton Borough. Schools in the district (with 2018–19 enrollment data from the National Center for Education Statistics) are 
Pinelands Regional Junior High School with 811 students in grades 7-9 and 
Pinelands Regional High School with 744 students in grades 10-12. The district's board of education includes nine members directly elected by the residents of the constituent municipalities to three-year terms on a staggered basis, with three seats up for election each year. Eagleswood Township is allocated one of the nine seats.

School
The Eagleswood Township Elementary School had an enrollment of 128 students in grades PreK-6 in the 2018–19 school year.

Administration
Core members of the district's administration are:
Deborah Snyder, Superintendent / Principal
Tyler Verga, Business Administrator

Board of education
The district's board of education, with five members, sets policy and oversees the fiscal and educational operation of the district through its administration. As a Type II school district, the board's trustees are elected directly by voters to serve three-year terms of office on a staggered basis, with either one or two seats up for election each year held (since 2012) as part of the November general election. The board appoints a superintendent to oversee the day-to-day operation of the district.

References

External links
Eagleswood Township Elementary School

School Data for the Eagleswood Township Elementary School, National Center for Education Statistics
Pinelands Regional School District

Eagleswood Township, New Jersey
New Jersey District Factor Group B
School districts in Ocean County, New Jersey
Public elementary schools in New Jersey